Megalopalpus simplex is a butterfly in the family Lycaenidae. It is found in Liberia, Ghana, Nigeria, Cameroon, Gabon, the Democratic Republic of the Congo and Uganda.

References

Butterflies described in 1886
Miletinae
Butterflies of Africa
Taxa named by Julius Röber